Emir Dzafič (born 8 September 1972) is a Slovenian former professional footballer who played as a midfielder.

References

External links
 

1972 births
Living people
Slovenian footballers
Association football midfielders
Slovenian expatriate footballers
Slovenian expatriate sportspeople in Croatia
Expatriate footballers in Croatia
Slovenian expatriate sportspeople in Germany
Expatriate footballers in Germany
NK Celje players
NK Rudar Velenje players
NK Mura players
VfL Bochum players
NK Samobor players
Bundesliga players
Expatriate footballers in Malaysia
Slovenian expatriate sportspeople in Malaysia
Slovenian PrvaLiga players